The 2003–2009 Chinese football match-fixing scandals were revealed by a large-scale 2009–2013 investigation of football betting, bribery and match-fixing. The scandals were first made public in October 2009. Instead of being led by General Administration of Sport of China or Chinese Football Association like previous investigations, this investigation was led by the Ministry of Public Security. Xie Yalong, Nan Yong and Yang Yimin, who are all former vice presidents of Chinese Football Association, along with Zhang Jianqiang and some other CFA officials were arrested and removed from their posts. Shanghai Shenhua was stripped of their 2003 Chinese Jia-A League title. Lu Jun, the only Chinese referee in the history of FIFA World Cup, and China national football team players Shen Si, Jiang Jin, Qi Hong and Li Ming were arrested and sentenced to 5.5 years or 6 years in jail.

Background 
In the aftermath of the 2001 Chinese football match-fixing scandal, referee Gong Jianping was jailed and died in the prison. Other team managers, referees and officials were not subject to any criminal prosecution. Shandong Luneng Taishan, Shanghai Shenhua and Zhejiang Green Town were fined 800,000 RMB, Jiangsu Sainty and Dalian Shide were fined 500,000 RMB, Qingdao Etsong Hainiu was fined 300,000 RMB. Their club managers were "seriously warned".

In 2006, Liaoshen Evening News report match-fixing event to the Chinese Football Association. Xie Yalong, Nan Yong and Yang Yimin replied "the CFA will carefully study the evidence and quickly request judicial intervention. Please report to us again next time."

Notable affected matches

Shanghai Shenhua vs Shanghai COSCO Sanlin in 2003 

It was revealed in 2011 that the referee Lu Jun and CFA official Zhang Jianqiang received bribes totaling 700,000 yuan from Shanghai Shenhua before this Shanghai derby match between the top two teams. In 2013, Shanghai Shenhua was stripped of its 2003 title. Lu Jun, once nicknamed "Golden Whistle" (金哨), was sentenced to 5.5 years in prison for fixing the results of the Shanghai derby and six other league matches.

Shanghai COSCO Sanlin vs Tianjin TEDA in 2003 

The CFA stipulated that the result of "the 2002 Jia-A League rank * 0.5 + the 2003 Jia-A League rank" will be used to determine the teams participating the newly created Chinese Super League in 2004. In the final round of the 2003 Jia-A League, Chongqing Lifan would have to lose to Qingdao Etsong Hainiu and hope Shanghai COSCO Sanlin, a title hopeful, could beat (or tie with) Tianjin TEDA. In the match, Chongqing's supporters cheered for the guest team, Qingdao, and Chongqing Lifan successfully lost to Qingdao Etsong Hainiu 1–3. However, Shanghai COSCO Sanlin lost to Tianjin TEDA in a 1–2 blowout. Tianjin TEDA gained the last seat for the inaugural Chinese Super League and Chongqing Lifan was relegated (although Chongqing was eventually able to qualify for the 2004 CSL by merging with Yunnan Hongta). Shanghai International finished one point behind the champions Shanghai Shenhua (in 2013, Shenhua were stripped of the title for bribing Lu Jun in the 9 November derby match).

In 2012, it was found that in 2003, the then vice president of the Chinese Football Association, Nan Yong, did not want Chongqing Lifan to "lose and qualify" and make the CFA rules a laughing stock. With Nan Yong's help, Tianjin TEDA's club manager, Zhang Yifeng, was able to contact Shanghai International and Chinese national football team player Shen Si, who then contacted club and national teammates Jiang Jin, Qi Hong and Li Ming. After Shanghai COSCO Sanlin lost to Tianjin TEDA, the four players received 8 million yuan in total. Shen Si was sentenced to six years in prison, the other three were sentenced to five years and six months in prison.

Guangzhou Pharmaceutical vs Shanxi Wosen Luhu in 2006 

Guangzhou Pharmaceutical's team leader Yang Xu bribed Wang Pu, the general manager of Shanxi Wosen Luhu.

Guangzhou Pharmaceutical vs Zhejiang Green Town in 2006 

With the help of the former CFA League Department official Fan Guangming, and retired Shandong Luneng player Leng Bo and Xing Rui, Guangzhou Pharmaceutical bribed the players of Zhejiang Green Town, Shen Liuxi and Hu Minghua, with a total amount of 1.5 million yuan.

Qingdao Hailifeng vs Chengdu Blades in 2007 

Chengdu Blades general manager Xu Hongtao and deputy general manager You Ke offered Qingdao Hailifeng with 300,000 yuan and free winter training for a month at Chengdu's base, in exchange with Chengdu's victory of the match.

"Chip Shot Gate" of Qingdao Hailifeng in 2009 

In a 2009 match against the bottom-of-the-league Sichuan F.C., Qingdao Hailifeng were leading 3–0 with 20 minutes left. But having bet before the match that the total number of goals would be at least four, Qingdao Hailifeng's chairman, Du Yunqi, asked the team for another goal into either net. Due to Sichuan's defensive effort, Qingdao was unable to score another goal. In the last minutes, Qingdao players tried three chip shots into their own goal. However, due to the goalkeeper Mou Pengfei's two saves on his teammates' shots and with the third attempt going wide, the match ended 3–0. The match was known as "Chip Shot Gate (吊射门)" in China. In 2010, CFA revoked Qingdao Helifeng's league registration. In 2012, Du Yunqi was sentenced to seven years in prison.

Punishment

Clubs 
On February 21, 2010, the CFA Disciplinary Committee made preliminary punishment decisions for clubs identified by the Ministry of Public Security Gambling Task Force as being involved in match-fixing cases.

 2009 Chinese Super League teams Guangzhou Pharmaceutical and Chengdu Blades were relegated to China League One
 2009 China League One team Qingdao Hailifengs league registration was revoked, the club was fined 200,000 RMB

On February 18, 2013, the CFA Disciplinary Committee again announced its decision to punish the clubs involved in the match-fixing cases:

 Shanghai Shenhua was stripped of the 2003 Chinese Jia-A League champion title and deducted 6 points in the 2013 Chinese Super League and fined 1 million RMB
 Tianjin TEDA was deducted 6 points in the 2013 Chinese Super League and fined 1 million yuan
 Yanbian Changbai Tiger was deducted 3 points in the 2013 China League One and fined 500,000 RMB
 Shandong Luneng Taishan was fined 1 million RMB
 Changchun Yatai, Jiangsu Sainty and Henan Jianye were fined 500,000 RMB

Individuals 
In addition, punishment was imposed on the individuals involved:

Convicted individuals and clubs

CFA officials

Referees

Players and Coaches

Clubs and Staff

Related articles 
 2001 Chinese football match-fixing scandal
 2003 Chinese Jia-A League
 1999 Chinese football match-fixing scandal

Notes

References 

Association football controversies
Sports scandals in China
2003 in Chinese football
2004 in Chinese football
2005 in Chinese football
2006 in Chinese football
2007 in Chinese football
2008 in Chinese football
2009 in Chinese football
2010 in Chinese football
2011 in Chinese football
2012 in Chinese football
2013 in Chinese football
Chinese Jia-A League
China League One
Chinese Super League
Match fixing